Garry Glenn (May 12, 1955 – September 27, 1991) was an American singer, songwriter and musician best known for his association with his songwriting partner Dianne Quander and wrote the hit song "Caught Up in the Rapture", recorded by Anita Baker in 1986. He also wrote “Intimate Friends” that was recorded by Eddie Kendricks and later sampled by Alicia Keys for the Grammy Award-nominated recording “Unbreakable.”

Biography
Garry Dewayne Glenn was born on May 12, 1955, in Detroit, the son of Robert and Bonnie (née Beard) Glenn. As a teenager, he toured with his sister, Gospel singer, Beverly Glenn. By the late 1970s, he turned his attention to songwriting. In the 1980s he was a frequent songwriting collaborator with Dianne Quander.  His songs have been recorded by The Dramatics, Earth, Wind & Fire, The Emotions, Eddie Kendricks, Jean Carne and Anita Baker.

Selected Songwriting Credits

Recording artist
In 1980, Glenn recorded his eponymous album for PPL Records.  Later, he joined the Motown roster, which released his second and final album, Feels Good To Feel Good in 1987, which was moderately successful. On the latter album, he wrote or co-wrote all of the songs (including four with Dianne Quander).

Death
Glenn died on September 27, 1991, from kidney failure.

Legacy
His songs continued to be recorded by other artists and sampled by others.  His song, "Intimate Friends" (as recorded by Eddie Kendricks) was sampled on the track, "Old Time's Sake" by Sweet Sable, which appeared on the 1994 soundtrack for Above the Rim. In 2005, Alicia Keys sampled the same song on "Unbreakable".  The latter recording was nominated for two Grammys and won two NAACP Image Awards.
Sparkle sampled the song on the track, "Time to Move On" on her 1998 debut album.

Notes
Both the All Music Guide and Soulwalking websites list Glenn's date of the death as September 18, 1991.  The date from the California Death Index is used instead.

References

External links
 Soulwalking – Garry Glenn Page

1955 births
1991 deaths
American male pop singers
American pop pianists
American male pianists
American rhythm and blues singer-songwriters
Motown artists
Deaths from kidney failure
Record producers from California
American soul musicians
20th-century American singers
20th-century American businesspeople
20th-century American pianists
Singers from Detroit
20th-century American male singers
American male singer-songwriters
Singer-songwriters from Michigan